Leonard Hargreaves (7 March 1906 – 1980) was an English professional footballer who played as a winger for Sunderland.

References

1906 births
1980 deaths
People from the Metropolitan Borough of Rotherham
English footballers
Association football wingers
Doncaster Rovers F.C. players
Sunderland A.F.C. players
Sheffield Wednesday F.C. players
Workington A.F.C. players
Luton Town F.C. players
Peterborough United F.C. players
English Football League players